Fohr may refer to 
Föhr, a North Frisian island, in Nordfriesland, Germany
Wyk auf Föhr, a town on Föhr
Föhr-Land, a municipality in Nordfriesland, Germany
Föhr North Frisian, a North Frisian dialect spoken on Föhr 
Fohr (surname)